Hanna Huttunen (born 14 April 1969, in Outokumpu) is a Finnish politician currently serving in the Parliament of Finland for the Centre Party at the Savonia-Karelia constituency.

References

1969 births
Living people
People from Outokumpu
Centre Party (Finland) politicians
Members of the Parliament of Finland (2019–23)
21st-century Finnish women politicians
Women members of the Parliament of Finland